Michał Karwan (born February 7, 1979 in Gliwice) is a Polish association football defender who played in the Ekstraklasa for Górnik Zabrze and Cracovia.

Career

Club
In May 2011, his contract with Górnik Zabrze was terminated.

References

External links 
 

1979 births
Living people
Polish footballers
Association football defenders
Górnik Zabrze players
MKS Cracovia (football) players
Sportspeople from Gliwice
Tomasovia Tomaszów Lubelski players